Nationality words link to articles with information on the nation's poetry or literature (for instance, Irish or France).

Events
February 20 – Giacomo Meyerbeer pays Mathilde Heine 4,500 francs not to publish four poems by her late husband Heinrich Heine.
Charles Baudelaire's study on Théophile Gautier is published in Revue contemporaine.

Works published

United Kingdom
 Cecil Frances Alexander, Hymns Descriptive and Devotional for the Use of Schools
 Matthew Arnold, Merope
 William Barnes, Hwomely Rhymes: A second collection of poems of rural life in the Dorset Dialect
 Elizabeth Rundle Charles, The Voice of Christian Life in Song
 Arthur Hugh Clough, "Amours de Voyage", English poet published in The Atlantic Monthly in the United States (reprinted in the author's posthumous Poems 1862)
 William Johnson Cory, Ionica
 Charles Kingsley, Andromedia, and Other Poems
 Walter Savage Landor, Dry Sticks, Fagoted
 William Morris, The Defence of Guenevere, and Other Poems dedicated to Dante Gabriel Rossetti; the author's first book
 Adelaide Anne Procter, Legends and Lyrics, first series, (1858–61), including "The Lost Chord", set to music by Sir Arthur Sullivan
 Catherine Winkworth, Lyra Germanica: Second Series (see also Lyra Germanica 1855)

United States
 Thomas Bailey Aldrich, The Course of True Love Never Did Run Smooth
 Arthur Hugh Clough, "Amours de Voyage", English poet published in The Atlantic Monthly in the United States (reprinted in the author's posthumous Poems 1862)
 James T. Fields, A Few Verses for a Few Friends
 William J. Grayson, The Country
 Oliver Wendell Holmes, The Autocrat of the Breakfast-Table, essays
 Henry Wadsworth Longfellow, The Courtship of Miles Standish and Other Poems
 Frances Harper, "Bury Me in a Free Land", November 20

Other in English
 Thomas D'Arcy McGee, Canadian Ballads, Montreal, Canada

Other languages
 Alphonse Daudet, Les Amoureuses, France
 Aleksey K. Tolstoy, Vasily Shibanov, Russia

Births
Death years link to the corresponding "[year] in poetry" article:
 January 24 – Constance Naden (died 1889), English poet and philosopher
 June 1 – William Wilfred Campbell (died 1918), Canadian
 June 16 – Isabel Richey (died 1910), American
 July 1 – Velma Caldwell Melville (died 1924), American editor and writer
 August 2 – Sir William Watson (died 1935), English
 August 15 – Edith Nesbit (died 1924), English author and poet
 September 5 – Victor Daley (died 1905), Australian
 Also:
 Balashankar (died 1899), Indian, Gujarati-language poet
 Dollie Radford, née Caroline Maitland (died 1920), English poet and writer, wife of Ernest Radford

Deaths
Death years link to the corresponding "[year] in poetry" article:
 December 18 – Thomas Holley Chivers (born 1807), American

See also

 19th century in poetry
 19th century in literature
 List of years in poetry
 List of years in literature
 Victorian literature
 French literature of the 19th century
 Poetry

Notes

19th-century poetry
Poetry